Caroline Middleton DeCamp Benn (née DeCamp; 13 October 1926 – 22 November 2000), formerly Viscountess Stansgate, was an educationalist and writer, and wife of the British Labour politician Tony Benn (formerly 2nd Viscount Stansgate).

Biography
Benn was born Caroline Middleton DeCamp in Cincinnati, Ohio, the eldest daughter of Anne Hetherington (née Graydon) and James Milton DeCamp, a Cincinnati lawyer. Educated at Vassar College (BA, 1946) and the University of Cincinnati (BA, 1948), she travelled to the United Kingdom in 1948 to study at Oxford University and voted for Henry Wallace, the Progressive Party candidate in that year's American Presidential election. She gained an English MA on Jacobean drama (specifically on the masques of Inigo Jones) at University College London in 1951.

She met Benn over tea at Worcester College, Oxford, in 1949, and just nine days later he proposed to her on a park bench in the city. Later, he bought the bench from Oxford City Council and installed it in the garden of their house in Holland Park. In June 1999, on their golden wedding anniversary, she put on the red striped dress she had worn that night. She had four children – Stephen, Hilary, Melissa and Joshua – and ten grandchildren.

Benn devoted her life to comprehensive education and was co-founder of the Campaign for Comprehensive Education. She sent her own children to Holland Park School, one of the first comprehensive schools in the country. In 1970, she wrote alongside Professor Brian Simon, Halfway There – the definitive study of the progress of comprehensive reform in the UK. This was followed up in 1997 with Thirty Years On, which she co-wrote with Professor Clyde Chitty. Her widely respected and authoritative biography of the Labour founder Keir Hardie was published in 1992.

As well as writing extensively about education, Benn held a number of other positions: She was a member of the Inner London Education Authority from 1970 to 1977, an ILEA Governor at Imperial College London, a tutor at the Open University, a lecturer at Kensington and Hammersmith Further Education College from 1970 to 1996, a governor of Holland Park School for thirty-five years (serving thirteen of those as chair of the governors), and president of the Socialist Education Association.

Benn played an important role in her husband's political career. She was popular with his colleagues and her views were respected. She is personally credited with having suggested the title of the Labour Party manifesto for the 1964 general election; she proposed The New Britain, and it eventually became Let's Go With Labour for the New Britain. She supported her husband's proposals in the 1980s for Labour's leadership and direction. However, she was also able to provide constructive criticism throughout his political career, such as his 1998 ITN documentary.

Benn was diagnosed with breast cancer in June 1996, having been unwell for about a year, but fought the illness for several further years. She became increasingly frail during 2000, having developed spinal metastases, and died at Charing Cross Hospital, London, on 22 November 2000.

A Tribute to Caroline Benn: Education and Democracy, edited by her daughter and Clyde Chitty, was published in 2004, featuring essays on her life and on educational reform and her life's work.

Publications
 Comprehensive School Reform and the 1945 Labour Government (1980), History Workshop Journal
 Lion in a Den of Daniels (1962), a novel
 Halfway There: Report on the British Comprehensive School Reform (1970), with Professor Brian Simon
 Higher Education For Everyone (1982)
 Keir Hardie: A Biography (1992)
 Thirty Years On (1997), with Professor Clyde Chitty

References

External links
 Tribute to Caroline Benn
 Caroline Benn at Google Books

1926 births
2000 deaths
20th-century American women writers
Academics of the Open University
Alumni of the University of Oxford
Alumni of University College London
American emigrants to England
Caroline
Comprehensive education
Deaths from cancer in England
Deaths from breast cancer
English educational theorists
People associated with Imperial College London
Writers from Cincinnati
University of Cincinnati alumni
Vassar College alumni
Stansgate
Tony Benn
Spouses of British politicians